Major General Percy Fernando, RWP, RSP, psc, CR (died 2000) was a Sri Lankan Army officer, who was the Deputy GOC, 54 Division based at Elephant Pass and prior to which he was the brigade commander of the independent Special Forces Brigade.

Educated at Royal College, Colombo, where he represented the school and captained the rowing team  and winning several races at the Royal Thomian Regatta. Fernando joined the army after leaving school and was commissioned as a second lieutenant. Later he transferred to the Commando Regiment when it was formed in the 1980s. 

Brigadier Fernando was the Sri Lanka Military Academy from 1998 to 2000. He served as the Deputy GOC, 54 Division based at Elephant Pass during the Second Battle of Elephant Pass in 2000. Following orders from the GOC 54 Division to evacuate the base and make a strategic withdrawal of troops from Elephant Pass, Brigadier Fernando organized and carried out an orderly withdrawal, commanding the rear guard alongside his  troops. At this point during the withdrawal he was killed by a sniper. He was promoted to the rank of major general posthumously. 
   
General Fernando has received the Rana Wickrama Padakkama (RWP), Rana Sura Padakkama (RSP),  Uttama Seva Padakkama (USP), the Sri Lanka Armed Services Long Service Medal, the Riviresa Campaign Services Medal, the Purna Bhumi Padakkama and the North and East Operations Medal.

The Amateur Rowing Association of Sri Lanka and the Colombo Rowing Club honour his memory by awarding the Percy Fernando Memorial Trophy annually to the winner of the over 19 event

References

External links
Troops capture Elephant Pass:Road to Jaffna open
Major shuffle in the army hierarchy

Sri Lankan major generals
Year of birth missing
Alumni of Royal College, Colombo
2000 deaths
Sri Lanka Army Commando officers
Sri Lankan military personnel killed in action
Sinhalese military personnel